Immortalized may refer to:

Music

Albums 
Immortalized (3X Krazy album)
Immortalized (Disturbed album)
Immortalized (Spice 1 album)

Songs 
Immortalized (song), by Disturbed from the album of the same name
"Immortalized", by HammerFall from the album Infected

Other uses 
Biological immortality, where death occurs from injury or disease rather than deterioration
Immortalized cell line, cells that have acquired the ability to proliferate indefinitely